Thomas Flynn Edgar (born April 17, 1945) is an American chemical engineer.  

He was elected a member of the National Academy of Engineering in 2014 for contributions to mathematical modeling, optimization, and automatic control of chemical and microelectronics processes, and for professional leadership. 

Edgar is the George T. and Gladys H. Abell Chair in Chemical Engineering at the University of Texas at Austin.

Education 
Edgar received his B.S. in chemical engineering in 1967 from the University of Kansas and his Ph.D. in chemical engineering in 1971 from Princeton University. Edgar worked briefly as a process engineer with the Continental Oil Company before joining the UT's chemical engineering faculty in 1971. He served as Department Chair of Chemical Engineering (1985-93), Associate Dean of Engineering (1993-96), and Associate Vice President for Academic Computing (1996-2001) at UT-Austin. In 2012 he became the Director of the University of Texas at Austin Energy Institute.

Academic career 
Edgar’s academic work has focused on process modeling, control, and optimization. He has published over 500 articles and book chapters in the above fields applied to separations, chemical reactors, energy systems, and semiconductor manufacturing. He has supervised the research of over 45 M.S. and 80 Ph.D. students. He also co-directs the Texas-Wisconsin-California Control Consortium which involves 13 companies and four universities.
Edgar authored the textbook Coal Processing and Pollution Control Technology (Gulf Publishing, 1983), and co-authored the textbooks Optimization of Chemical Processes (McGraw-Hill, 2001) and Process Dynamics and Control (Wiley, 2010). The first edition of Process Dynamics and Control received the 1990 American Society of Engineering Education (ASEE) Meriam-Wiley Award as the top engineering textbook, and the book (now in its third edition) is used at over 60 universities in the U.S. He was the lead author for the Process Control section for the last two editions of Perry's Chemical Engineers' Handbook.

Edgar served as Chair of the American Institute of Chemical Engineers' (AIChE) Computing and Systems Technology Division in 1986. He was President of the Computer Aids for Chemical Engineering Education (CACHE) Corporation from 1981 to 1984 and has served as Executive Director of CACHE since 2001. He was President of the American Automatic Control Council between 1989 and 1991, which oversees the control activities of eight U.S. professional societies. He is board secretary of Pecan Street, Inc. (Austin, TX), which deals with renewable energy and smart grids, and also served on the ABET Board of Directors (2011-2013) and the Board of the Smart Manufacturing Leadership Coalition.
Edgar was a Director of AIChE from 1989-92, and he was elected Vice President of AIChE for 1996 and President for 1997. He was Chair of the AIChE Foundation from 2002-2008. He also served as Vice-Chair and Chair of the Council for Chemical Research (1991-93). He served as a representative of AIChE on the Engineering Accreditation Commission from 2005-2010. He was founding general editor of the technical journal, In Situ, and has participated on six editorial boards and five university advisory committees. Edgar has been a consultant to several companies, including AMD, Texas Instruments, Emerson Process Management, Applied Materials, and Chemstations.

Recognition
Edgar received the Outstanding AIChE Student Chapter Counselor Award in 1974, AIChE’s Colburn Award for research contributions in 1980 and Computing in Chemical Engineering Award in 1995, the AIChE Lewis Award in 2005, the F. J. & Dorothy Van Antwerpen Award in 2010, and the Research Excellence in Sustainable Engineering Award in 2013; the ASEE George Westinghouse Young Educator Award in 1988 and Union Carbide Chemical Engineering Division Lectureship in 1996; the 1992 John R. Ragazzini Education Award from the American Automatic Control Council; the 1993 Donald P. Eckman Education Award from ISA and the Pruitt Award from the Council for Chemical Research in 2009. He received the Joe J. King Professional Engineering Achievement Award from the University of Texas in 1989, the Distinguished Engineering Service Award from the University of Kansas in 1990, and the Control Engineering Prize from IFAC in 2005. He is listed in Who’s Who in America and Who’s Who in Engineering and is a Fellow of AIChE, IFAC, and ASEE. In 2007 he was selected by Control Magazine for the Process Automation Hall of Fame.

References 

1945 births
Living people
American chemical engineers
University of Texas at Austin faculty
University of Kansas alumni
Princeton University School of Engineering and Applied Science alumni
Members of the United States National Academy of Engineering
Richard E. Bellman Control Heritage Award recipients
Fellows of the American Institute of Chemical Engineers
Fellows of the International Federation of Automatic Control